Jesika Jacqueline Jiménez Luna (born June 8, 1980) is a Panamanian fencer. She competed in the individual épée event at the 2008 Summer Olympics, and was also the nation's flag bearer at the opening ceremony. She earned her first victory against Yana Shemyakina (Ukraine) in the first round, but was eliminated in the subsequent round after being defeated by Imke Duplitzer (Germany).

References

External links
NBC Profile

1980 births
Living people
Sportspeople from Panama City
Panamanian female épée fencers
Olympic fencers of Panama
Fencers at the 2008 Summer Olympics
Pan American Games medalists in fencing
Pan American Games bronze medalists for Panama
Fencers at the 2003 Pan American Games
Medalists at the 2003 Pan American Games